Meaburn Staniland (1809–1898) was a British Liberal Party politician.

Life
He was the son of James Staniland, educated at Lincoln Grammar School. He was a solicitor at Boston, Lincolnshire, senior partner in the firm Staniland & Wigglesworth.

He was elected as a Member of Parliament (MP) for Boston at the 1859 general election, but was narrowly defeated at the 1865 general election. An election petition led in 1866 to the result being overturned: his opponent Thomas Parry was unseated, and the seat awarded to Staniland.

Staniland resigned from House of Commons on 8 March 1867 by becoming Steward of the Manor of Northstead.

Family
Staniland married in 1840 Emma Stainbank, daughter of Robert William Stainbank of Skirbeck, and resided at Harrington Hall. They had five sons and three daughters. Of the children:

James Meaburn Staniland (1841–1905), the eldest son, was a cleric.
Robert Staniland, lawyer, town clerk of Boston and militia colonel. He was father of Meaburn and Geoffrey Staniland, both killed in World War I in 1915. Geoffrey was the father of Christopher Stainbank Staniland (1905–1942) the test pilot. The writer Meaburn Staniland (1914–1992) was the youngest son of Meaburn (died 1915).
Meaburn Staniland F.G.S. (born 1853), third son.
Charles Arthur Staniland (born 1856) was an army officer.
Alfred Edward Staniland (born 1861), fifth son, a barrister. He married in 1903 Helen Katherine Overton, only child of John Henry Overton.
Edith Meaburn, second daughter, married in 1877 Richard Worsley (1838–1899), army officer in India.

References

External links 

1809 births
1898 deaths
Liberal Party (UK) MPs for English constituencies
UK MPs 1859–1865
UK MPs 1865–1868